Lawrencezomus is a genus of hubbardiid short-tailed whipscorpions, first described by Luis de Armas in 2014.

Species 
, the World Schizomida Catalog accepts the following two species:

 Lawrencezomus atlanticus Armas, 2014 – Cameroon
 Lawrencezomus bong Armas, 2014 – Liberia

References 

Schizomida genera